Amaveni Township is a high density suburb in Kwekwe, Zimbabwe. The township's name of 'Amaveni' according to one of its first residents, the late Jonas Macela Nkomo (1908–2002), was derived from a Ndebele army's battalion that was called by the same name. The battalion fought during the 1893 Anglo-Ndebele war in Matebeleland region of Zimbabwe.

History 
Amaveni is one of the oldest suburbs or townships in Zimbabwe. It was established at the beginning of the 20th century by the Southern Rhodesian colonial authorities as a racially segregated dormitory township for African male labourers. Most of these labourers worked as house servants for white families in the nearby suburbs of Fitchlea, Newtown, Masasa Park and Hillandale or in the newly established shops and factories. Some of the residents also worked for the nearby gold mines of Globe and Phoenix, Gaika and Riverlea, particularly those who could not be housed at the mine workers' compounds. Some of the first buildings in Amaveni were the hostels for male labourers (currently being used as the youth centre, Rugare Old People's Home and informal sector workshops). Today Amaveni's population is made up of people from different professional backgrounds; civil servants, workers from the heavy industries of Zimbabwe Iron and Smelting Company (ZIMASCO), Zimbabwe Iron and Steel Company (ZISCO [now NewZim Steel]), Lancashire Steel, Sable Chemicals, Haggie Rand Zimbabwe, National Breweries among other industries. A huge proportion of the residents are engaged in the informal sector, mainly fruit and vegetable vending as well as informal gold mining. Amaveni High school is the only high school in the suburb, the pass rates are very low because of the inadequacy of resources, however some pupils excel despite the unfriendly landscape, in fact Amaveni high school boasts with a number of its former students who are now captains of industry and many a former students who are now in various universities across the country.

Today 
Today, Amaveni house addresses are arranged into sections which are named alphabetically from A to W with the W section easily outnumbering all the other sections. It is located west of the city centre, where most of the roads are dusty and the residents are poor working class or self-employed.

Amaveni has an estimated 2,000 houses, but because of the overcrowding the population is estimated to be around 20,000.

The main bus terminus for the city of Kwekwe is located in the suburb opposite the Batanai tavern. There has been one main shopping centre till 2002 when another one was established at the 'Superette' in the W section of the township.

There are three primary schools, namely Amaveni Primary School, Kushinga Primary School and St Martin's Primary School. Only one high school exists, Amaveni High School.

Notable residents 
 Blessing Chebundo MP
 Mayor Hwingwiri (late)
 Headmaster Mswelanto (first headmaster of St Martin's Primary School)
 John Phiri (Wankie and National football player)
 Kenneth Jere (footballer)
 Shaiso Chiduku (Nationally renowned football goalkeeper)
 Madoda Nkomo (body builder)
 Zig Zag Band
 Gilbert Zvamaida (Lead Guitarist)
 NiQ Mangezi (International Film Director)
 George Mabhewu  (Fastest sprinter) 
 Shanda, Kayoyo, Dhuri, Chigagura (Nyau dancers)

Notable landmarks 
 Arimanyongo hotel
 Chikomo Beerhall
 Batanai Tavern
 Amaveni primary and secondary schools
 St Martins primary school
 Mary Ward Children's home
 Big Bar (Bhawa)
 Amaveni bus terminus
 Amaveni stadium
 Amaveni hall

Blessing Chebundo member of parliament of Kwekwe resides in Amaveni//Currently Masango Matambanadzo is the MP

Suburbs in Kwekwe